Les Misérables is a 2012 epic period musical film directed by Tom Hooper from a screenplay by William Nicholson, Alain Boublil, who wrote the original French lyrics, Claude-Michel Schönberg, who wrote the music, and Herbert Kretzmer, who wrote the English lyrics. The film is based on the 1985 West End English translation of the 1980 French musical by Boublil and Schönberg, which itself is adapted from the 1862 French novel of the same name by Victor Hugo. The film stars an ensemble cast led by Hugh Jackman, Russell Crowe, Anne Hathaway, Eddie Redmayne, Amanda Seyfried, Helena Bonham Carter, and Sacha Baron Cohen.

Les Misérables received eight Academy Award nominations, including Best Picture, and won three: Best Supporting Actress for Hathaway, Best Sound Mixing, and Best Makeup and Hairstyling.

Accolades

References

External links
 

Lists of accolades by film